Kisimi Kamara (1890–1962) was a simple village tailor from Sierra Leone who gave his people the gift of writing. He invented the Mende syllabary in 1921.

Early life
Kisimi Kamara  was born in 1890 in the village of Vaama, Pujehun District in the Southern Province of Sierra Leone to a Kuranko father and a Mandingo mother. His parents had long lived in the Pujehun District, a Mende predominant district. As a child Kisimi had no access to Western education, where he could have learned English. Instead his parents sent him  Arabic language school under the local Karamoko, but his fellow villagers knew him as a man of unusual intelligence and energy. Kisimi had seen how the British had taken over the country and subjected the chiefs to their will. He felt that the white man's power derived, to some extent, from his ability to read and write, and he vowed that his own people should have the same ability.

In 1921, Kisimi was inspired by a dream or vision. He shut himself up alone in his house for ten weeks, and then emerged with a fully complete system of writing. He had developed what linguists call a syllabary, a set of characters representing consonant-vowel combinations. Kisimi called his new writing "Ki-ka-ku" for the first three letters in a system containing a total of 195 symbols. He devised a method for teaching Ki-ka-ku, and opened a school at Potoru, Pujehun District. During the 1920s and 1930s, Kisimi Kamara became a famous man in the Mende country, as many people learned to read and write in this Ki-ka-ku system. His writing became popular for record-keeping and correspondence, and some chiefdom clerks adopted it for official use.

But, in the 1940s, the British established the Protectorate Literacy Bureau in Bo which began teaching people to read and write Mende in a modified version of the Latin alphabet. Kisimi Kamara's system of writing gradually fell into disuse and was forgotten, and in his later years Kisimi was disappointed that his system had been abandoned.

Death
He died in 1962 and was buried in his home town of Vaama. Kisimi's brilliant invention was destroyed by colonialism, but his work inspired among his people a pride in their native language and a determination to develop it to its full potential.

References

External links
https://web.archive.org/web/20071214153102/http://www.sierra-leone.org/heroes7.html

1890 births
1962 deaths
Sierra Leonean writers
People from Pujehun District